John Knox (1778–1845) was a 19th-century Scottish landscape artist who painted in the style of Alexander Nasmyth. He is noted for adopting unusual positions from which to paint, such as mountaintops.

Life

Knox was born the son of John Knox in 1778. His family moved to Glasgow in 1799. He is thought to be the "John Knox Jr, portrait painter" mentioned in the 1810 Glasgow Post Office Directory living at 34 Miller Street. He taught Horatio McCulloch and Daniel Macnee.

Known Works

Glasgow Green (c.1810) - Georgian House Museum, Charlotte Square
Old Glasgow Bridge (1817)
The First Steamboat on the Clyde (c.1820)
South-Western View of Ben Lomond (1834)
Landscape with Tourists at Loch Katrine National Museum of Scotland
The Head of Glen Sannox, Arran
The Cloch Lighthouse
Lake District Scene
View of Loch Lomond
Seascape with Lighthouse
The Road Home - Loch Katrine
Oxen on a Bridge

References

1778 births
1845 deaths
Scottish landscape artists